Fabrice Santoro and Todd Woodbridge were the defending champions, but they decided not to participate together.
Santoro played alongside Cédric Pioline, while Woodbridge partnered up with Thomas Enqvist.
Albert Costa and Carlos Moyá won the event beating Enqvist and Woodbridge in the final, 6–2, 6–1

Draw

Final

Group A
Standings are determined by: 1. number of wins; 2. number of matches; 3. in three-players-ties, percentage of sets won, or of games won; 4. steering-committee decision.

Group B
Standings are determined by: 1. number of wins; 2. number of matches; 3. in three-players-ties, percentage of sets won, or of games won; 4. steering-committee decision.

References
Main Draw

Legends Under 45 Doubles